Storo is a neighborhood in the boroughs of Sagene and Nordre Aker in Oslo, Norway. It is located east of Nydalen, south-west of Grefsen and north of Sandaker. In addition to block housing, it hosts the Storo Storsenter shopping center. There are also many car dealerships in the area. The Ring 3 trunk road runs through Storo, and the area is served by Storo station on the Oslo T-bane and Oslo Tramway.

The name
The neighbourhood is named after the farm Storo. This farm was the big (store) part of the old farm O. The farm O is first mentioned in 1279 ("Oo"), and the name is identical with the Norse word ó, a sideform of á f 'river' (here Akerselva river).

The farm was divided into two parts around 1550 AD: Storo ("Store O") and Lillo ("Lille O" - lille means 'little').

Neighbourhoods of Oslo